St Mary's Greek Orthodox Church is a Greek Orthodox church in Trinity Road, Wood Green, London. It was built as Trinity Methodist Church in 1871 to the design of the reverend R.N. Johnson and became Greek Orthodox in 1970. It was greatly rebuilt after a fire in 1986 with the help of the Greek community and fundraising events notably a Dinner & Dance arranged by a pupil of the Greek school Nick Efthymiou. It is also sometimes known as St Mary's Cathedral or The Greek Orthodox Cathedral of the Dormition of the Mother of God.

References

External links 

Wood Green
Churches in the London Borough of Haringey
Greek Orthodox churches in the United Kingdom
Church buildings converted to a different denomination
Greek Orthodox cathedrals in England